Villa de Cura or Villa de San Luis Rey de Cura is the main town in the Zamora district of the Aragua state in Venezuela.

A small town, very dry between the months of October and April and rainy during the rest of the year, it is best known in Venezuela for being the cradle of one of the best all-male children choirs in the country, Niños Cantores de Villa de Cura . The tiny town is also well known by its chicharrones and cachapas, all local foods.

Prominent residents 
Amador Bendayán,  (1920–1989) was a Venezuelan actor and entertainer.
Consuelo Fernández, (1797-1814) was a resistance fighter in the Venezuelan War of Independence, given the honor of "heroine" Venezuelan War of Independence
José Pérez Colmenares, (1914–1944) was a baseball pioneer in Venezuela and a member of the National Team that captured the Baseball World Cup in 1941 Baseball World Cup
Eduardo Escobar, (born 1989) is a Venezuelan professional MLB third baseman for the New York Mets.
Hernán Pérez, (born 1991) is a Venezuelan professional baseball utility player in the Atlanta Braves.

References

External links

Conociendo a Aragua (Spanish) at Tour Aragua Blog Spot

Populated places in Aragua
Populated places established in 1722